Julanan Khantikulanon is a Thai taekwondo practitioner.

She won a bronze medal in finweight at the 2019 World Taekwondo Championships, after being defeated by Sim Jae-young in the semifinal.

References

Year of birth missing (living people)
Living people
Julanan Khantikulanon
World Taekwondo Championships medalists
Southeast Asian Games medalists in taekwondo
Julanan Khantikulanon
Competitors at the 2017 Southeast Asian Games
Competitors at the 2019 Southeast Asian Games
Julanan Khantikulanon